This is a list of castros in Galicia (Spain), ordered by provinces.

Province of A Coruña

Province of Lugo

Province of Ourense

Province of Pontevedra

See also 
 List of castros in Asturias
 List of castros in Cantabria
 List of castros in Castile and León
 List of castros in the Basque country
 Castro culture
 Castros in Spain

External links 
 Castros catalog in Ferrol, Narón and Valdoviño.

Galicia
Galicia (Spain)
Lists of buildings and structures in Spain

Buildings and structures in Galicia (Spain)
Hill forts in Spain
Tourist attractions in Galicia (Spain)